Polish–Lithuanian Commonwealth Navy was the navy of the Polish–Lithuanian Commonwealth.

Early history 
The Commonwealth Navy was small and played a relatively minor role in the history of the Commonwealth.
Despite having access to the Baltic Sea and temporarily to the Black Sea, neither Poland nor Lithuania had any significant navy until the first naval commission was established by Sigismund II Augustus during the Northern Seven Years' War in 1568.

Vasa's plans for fleet creation
At the turn of the seventeenth century, Poland became ruled by the House of Vasa, and was involved in a series of wars with Sweden (see also dominium maris baltici). Vasa kings attempted to create a proper fleet, but their attempts met with repeated failures, due to lack of funds in the royal treasury (Polish nobility saw little need for the fleet and refused to raise taxes for its construction, and Gdańsk continued its opposition to the idea of a royal fleet). During the reign of Sigismund III, the most celebrated victory of the Commonwealth Navy under command of Admiral Arend Dickmann took place at the Battle of Oliwa in 1627 against Sweden, during the Polish-Swedish War. The victory over Sweden secured for Poland permanent access to the Atlantic, and laid the foundations for expeditions beyond Europe. The plans for the independent fleet fell through shortly afterwards due to a badly executed alliance with the Habsburgs who in 1629 took over the fleet.

The Commission of Royal Ships (Komisja Okrętów Królewskich) was created in 1625. This commission, along with the ultimate allocation of funds by the Sejm in 1637, attempted to create a permanent Commonwealth Navy. Władysław IV Waza who took the throne in 1632 bought 12 ships, and built a dedicated port for the royal navy (Władysławowo).

Władysław IV and plans for Navy expansion 

The 58th article signed and sworn by king Władysław IV Pacta conventa announced creation of a war fleet "according to needs of Commonwealth". Władysław, taking the throne after his father Sigismund III Vasa died in 1632, was in favour of expanding and modernising the Commonwealth military. One of his plans was the expansion of the Commonwealth Navy.

Despite his attempts he did not recover ships taken by Swedes in Wismar and Travemuende. Władysław decided to build a new fleet and created a "Naval Commission" with Gerard Denhoff as a chairman to fulfill this task. The choice of other members of this commission was not random, it contained wealthy king supporters, like the merchant and owner of a merchant fleet from Danzig, Georg Hewel (Gdańsk, Jerzy Hewel). Because the Sejm (Polish Diet) was at best reluctant to pay for new ships and royal chest was permanently empty it was due to Hewel that the new fleet was created at all. He gave to the king's disposal 10 ships, a few of them were carrying small caliber cannons. These ships had to be modernized in order to allow them to carry heavier cannons. Additionally the king wanted to build a few galleons in Danzig and Puck and because of long construction times, also to purchase a few ships abroad, but those plans were not realized (except of purchase of one Danish ship - requiring quite serious repair).

Thus the new 'Polish fleet' consisted of 10 ex-merchant ships: "Czarny Orzeł" (Black Eagle – 420 tons, 32 cannons), "Prorok Samuel" (Prophet Samuel – 400 tons, 24 cannons), "Wielkie Słońce" (Great Sun – 540 tons, 24 cannons), "Nowy Czarny Orzeł" (New Black Eagle – 24 cannons). Four smaller ships "Biały Orzeł" (White Eagle), "Charitas", "Gwiazda" (Star) and "Strzelec" (Saggitarius) had 200 tons and two the smallest "Święty Piotr" (Saint Peter) or "Fortuna" (Fortune) 160 tons and "Mały Biały Orzeł" (Small White Eagle) 140 tons and 4 small caliber cannons and additionally one small galley. Command of the newly created fleet was given to rear admiral Aleksander Seton.

The King did not forget to ensure a safe base for the newly created fleet. The Harbor in Puck was too shallow for the biggest ships and the usage of Wisłoujście (a fortress near Gdansk) was constantly plagued by difficulties from the Danzig Patricians (afraid that a king with a strong naval arm would step upon their "liberties", control tolls, exert taxes etc.). The royal engineers Friederich Getkant (Fryderyk Getkant), Jan Pleitner and Eliasz Arciszewski selected a location for two new fortifications with naval bases on the Hel peninsula. They were quite impressive and raised in record time (finished in 1634, consisting of strong wooden (oak) palisades, earthen walls, trenches and moats). These fortifications were named after the King and his brother: Władysławowo and Kazimierzowo (the small town of Władysławowo still exists on the Hel peninsula nowadays - the fort was more or less on its current edge).

Additionally about 500 Cossacks under Konstanty Kołek with their small boats (Chaika) were brought. It is uncertain if they were used at all. Their main goal was to plague Swedish communication and supply lines near Piława and on Zatoka Wiślana (Vistula Bay). There were plans to use Cossacks in their light but very fast boats against Inflanty (Livonia) and even to raid the Swedish shore (to burn, pillage, capture merchant ships etc.). Cossacks were known from their plundering raids on Black Sea (they even burned suburbs of Istanbul once or twice). Because of the overall tonnage and armament difference between Polish and Swedish naval fleets even before (in 1620s), the main role of the Polish fleet was to disrupt Swedish communication and supply lines, to capture merchant ships bringing supplies for the Swedes.

The king's plan never had strong support from Polish nobles (szlachta): high costs and reluctance to strengthen the king's power were always crippling Władysław's plans. Thus not even all the king's expenses for the modernization of those ten ships were fully repaid. Unfortunate international alliances (with Denmark and Muscovy) did not allow him to mount any offensive actions and the majority of the wars he participated in were defensive ones (like the Smolensk War with Muscovy in 1634). A new armistice with Sweden signed in Stumsdorf (Sztumska Wies) knocked the last argument out of the king's hand. After that the king wanted to use his ships to organize the first Polish merchant company (with help of Hewel), however Hewel's death stopped even those plans. Finally the ships were sold. The built fortifications were salt in Denmark's and the Danzig Patriciate eyes and under their pressure were destroyed in 1640s.

The Swedes were without king after the death of Gustavus Adolphus of Sweden and lost battles in Germany. The Polish nobles did not want to fight a new war so when the Swedes returned most of the lands they captured in the previous war, a new armistice for 35 years was signed. The cost of the Polish preparations for this war was comparable with the costs of the king's relief of Smolensk in 1634 and his campaign against Muscovy.

Commonwealth fleet after 1630s 

The fleet was destroyed in 1637 by Denmark, without a declaration of war.

The remaining ships were sold in the years 1641–1643, which marked the end of the Commonwealth Navy.

See also 
 Polish Navy
 Lithuanian Navy

Notes and references 

Polish Navy
Military history of the Polish–Lithuanian Commonwealth